Prequel,  Inc. is a US-based technology company that develops the Prequel mobile application enabling editing photos and videos with filters and effects. In February 2021, the app reached number 1 in the "Photo & Video" category of the US Apple App Store.

History
In 2016, the entrepreneur Timur Khabirov and the investor Serge Aliseenko registered a US corporation named AIAR Labs Inc, which was developing AR solutions as an outsourced contractor. Of several proprietary products, Prequel was selected for beta-testing as a product focused on editing photos and videos. In August 2018, Prequel was released on the Apple App Store, the launch costing 3 million USD, financed with the founders’ personal funds. The first release included approximately 10 filters for photos and the same amount of effects that augmented images with rose petals, rain and snow, VHS and film reel simulations, glitch, grain, sun puddles, and lomography. The respective Android app was released two years later, in June 2020.

In 2019, the app gained its first popularity in Asia, specifically in South Korea, after the account of the k-pop band BTS published Instagram stories edited with Prequel upon attending the 61st Grammy Awards.

In 2020, during the COVID lockdowns, celebrities took up publishing photos and videos edited with Prequel. Those publications increased the app's popularity on the North American market.

The company is headquartered in New York City and employs over 200 employees. In 2021, the Prequel founders Timur Khabirov and Serge Aliseenko launched a venture studio for startups working with artificial, computer vision, and AR-based visual art.

Technical features

The app uses artificial intelligence to process the content. Prequel tunes faces on image and video and ties various decorative elements to certain points on the human body and face. The Prequel app uses the Core ML, MNN, and TFLight frameworks to work with the neural networks. Some AI solutions are launched server-side, and some on the user's mobile device. A resulting photo or video edited with the app is called "a prequel." The app daily generates over 2 million such prequels, which are published by users in Instagram, TikTok, and other social media. By early 2021, the app had 440 "collections" of filters, over a half being free of charge.

See also 

 VSCO
 Picsart
 Animaker

References

2018 software
IOS software
Android (operating system) software
Photo software
Mobile applications
American social networking websites
Youth culture
Raw image processing software